Pocket Full of Kryptonite is the debut studio album by the American rock band Spin Doctors, released in August 1991. The album initially sold a respectable 60,000 copies in late 1991 due to its growing hardcore fanbase, before several radio stations (including WEQX in Vermont) started playing the single "Little Miss Can't Be Wrong" in mid-1992. The combined strength of the single along with the follow-up "Two Princes" led to the album's peak at Nos. 1 and 3 on the Billboard Top Heatseekers and Billboard 200 albums charts, respectively. It is currently the band's best selling album, and was certified 5× Platinum by the RIAA.

It was remastered and reissued in 2011 as a 20th-anniversary edition, with a bonus track added to the original album and a second disc of demos previously released only on cassette, plus two live tracks.

The album's title is a quote from the opening track, "Jimmy Olsen's Blues", a humorous song sung from the point of view of Jimmy Olsen, a character in the Superman comic book series. In the song, Jimmy Olsen tries to woo Lois Lane away from Superman, stating "I've got a pocket full of Kryptonite", Kryptonite being a fictional substance that weakens Superman. The cover, showing a phone booth, refers to Clark Kent frequently ducking into a nearby phone booth to change into his Superman attire.

Track listing

Original album

Notes
The track listing for the cassette release can be found inside the tape's inlay. Unlike the CD release of Pocket Full of Kryptonite, the cassettes did not feature a track listing on the back cover—only the black & white photography (as seen on the vinyl and CD releases) is depicted. The digital cassette release of  Pocket Full of Kryptonite, however, featured a black & white photograph of the band instead (sans the track listing).
The live tracks on the European release also appear on the live album Homebelly Groove...Live (1992), and were recorded September 27, 1990, at Wetlands Preserve in New York.

2011 anniversary edition disc 2

Personnel
Spin Doctors
 Chris Barron – lead vocals
 Eric Schenkman – guitar, backing vocals, lead vocals on "Off My Line", piano on "Forty or Fifty"
 Mark White – bass
 Aaron Comess – drums, organ, backing vocals on "Little Miss Can't Be Wrong", congas on "Forty or Fifty"

Additional musicians
John Popper – harmonica on "More Than She Knows" and "Off My Line", backing vocals on "Two Princes"
John Bush – tambourine on "Off My Line", congas on "How Could You Want Him (When You Know You Could Have Me)?"

Production
Producers: Frank Aversa, Peter Denenberg, Frankie LaRocka, Spin Doctors
Engineers: Frank Aversa, Peter Denenberg, Marc Schwartz, Spin Doctors
Assistant engineers: Jeff Lippay, Motley
Mixing: Peter Denenberg, Frankie La Rocka, Spin Doctors
Mastering: Ted Jensen at Sterling Sound, NYC
Production coordination: Jason J. Richardson
Guitar technician: Joseph Miselis
Equipment manager: John Darren Greene
Art direction: Francesca Restrepo
Photography: Paul Aresu, Paul LaRaia
Cover art: Darren Greene, Chris Gross, Nicky Lindeman
Liner notes: Cree McCree

Charts

Weekly charts

Year-end charts

Decade-end charts

Certifications

References

Spin Doctors albums
1991 debut albums
Epic Records albums
Albums produced by Frankie LaRocka